Malgorzata Marek-Sadowska is a Polish-American electronics engineer known for her research in VLSI circuit design. She is a professor emeritus of electrical and computer engineering at the University of California, Santa Barbara, a member of the university's Institute for Energy Efficiency, and the director of the VLSI CAD Lab at the university.

Marek-Sadowska was an assistant professor at the Warsaw University of Technology from 1976 until 1982. In 1979 she began a visiting position at the University of California, Berkeley, continued at Berkeley as a researcher, and moved to Santa Barbara in 1990. She was editor-in-chief of IEEE Transactions on Computer-Aided Design of Integrated Circuits and Systems from 1993 to 1997, and in 1997 she was elected as a Fellow of the IEEE. She retired in 2017.

References

Year of birth missing (living people)
Living people
Polish electronics engineers
American electronics engineers
American women engineers
Academic staff of the Warsaw University of Technology
University of California, Santa Barbara faculty
Fellow Members of the IEEE
American women academics
21st-century American women